The Hun Sen Cup is a Cambodian knockout football cup competition held annually by the Football Federation of Cambodia (FFC). Thirty-five teams participate in the competition as of 2022 season, including all clubs from the Cambodian Premier League and some from the Cambodian League 2. The cup usually starts from February and ends in November, the winner qualifies for the Cambodian Super Cup.

Preah Khan Reach Svay Rieng are the most successful team in the tournament with four titles. The current holders are Visakha, having beaten Boeung Ket 4–3 in the 2022 final to win their third title.

Format
Besides youth tournaments of certain levels, Cambodian League and Samdech Hun Sen Cup are the highest soccer tournaments organized yearly by FFC.

The Samdech Akka Moha Sena Padey Decho Hun Sen Cup refers to the name of Prime Minister Hun Sen. This trophy was first organized in 2007. 28 teams participated. There were 2 stages - group and knock out. 16 teams which qualified from the group stage played in the knock out stage until the finals.

In the 6th season of the Hun Sen Cup (Hun Sen Cup 2012), the format was changed until now. The top 8 or 10 teams of Cambodian League enter the group stage while the other teams from Phnom Penh and provinces play in qualification before going through to the group stage.

Matches
List of finals:

Performance by team

Season top scorers

Source:

Awards

Prize money

Regional stage
 Champion: 15,000,000 riels
 Runner-up: 7,500,000 riels 
 Third place: 5,000,000 riels

National stage
 Champion: 110,000,000 riels 
 Runner-up: 70,000,000 riels 
 Third place: 40,000,000 riels

References

External links
Hun Sen Cup results tables fixtures
Football Federation of Cambodia

 
Football competitions in Cambodia